Gdynk is a rural locality (a selo) in Akhtynsky Selsoviet, Akhtynsky District, Republic of Dagestan, Russia. The population was 400 as of 2010.

Geography
Gdynk is located 15 km west of Akhty (the district's administrative centre) by road. Kaluk is the nearest rural locality.

References 

Rural localities in Akhtynsky District